In Judaism, bedikah ("inspection",  bedikot) may refer to:

 checking if a niddah (menstruant woman) has stopped menstruating
 checking if shechita (animal slaughter) has been properly carried out

See also 
 Bedikas chametz